The 2016–17 Texas State Bobcats men's basketball team represented Texas State University in the 2016–17 NCAA Division I men's basketball season. The Bobcats, led by fourth-year head coach Danny Kaspar, played their home games at Strahan Coliseum in San Marcos, Texas as members of the Sun Belt Conference. They finished the season 22–14, 11–7 in Sun Belt play to finish in a three way tie for third place. At the Sun Belt tournament they defeated Louisiana–Monroe and UT Arlington before losing in the championship game to Troy. They received an invitation to the CollegeInsider.com Tournament where they defeated Lamar and Idaho before losing in the quarterfinals to Saint Peter's.

Previous season
The Bobcats finished the 2015–16 season 15–16, 8–12 in Sun Belt play to finish in a tie for seventh place. They defeated Georgia State in the first round of the Sun Belt tournament to advance to the quarterfinals where they lost to Texas–Arlington.

Roster

Schedule and results

|-
!colspan=9 style=| Exhibition

|-
!colspan=9 style=| Non-conference regular season

|-
!colspan=9 style=| Sun Belt regular season

|-
!colspan=9 style=| Sun Belt tournament

|-
!colspan=9 style=| CIT

References

Texas State Bobcats men's basketball seasons
Texas State
Texas State
2016 in sports in Texas
2017 in sports in Texas